Badan may refer to:

Arts and media

Films
 Do Badan, a 1966 Hindi film directed by Raj Khosla
 Jalte Badan, a 1973 Bollywood drama
 Kora Badan, a 1974 Bollywood drama directed by B.S. Ghad
 Kunwara Badan, a 1973 Bollywood drama directed by Vimal Tiwari

Other media
 Badan Empire, a fictional organization in the TV special Birth of the 10th! Kamen Riders All Together!! and the manga Kamen Rider Spirits

Organizations
 Badan Informasi Geospasial, the national surveying and mapping agency of Indonesia
 Badan Warisan Malaysia, an NGO formed in 1983, concerned with conservation of Malaysia's built heritage
 Badan Standardisasi Nasional, the International Organization for Standardization (ISO) member body for Indonesia

Other uses
 Badan (ship), a type of dhow
 Badan, a fluorescent probe molecule, analogue of Prodan
 Badhan, Sanaag, a city and district in northeastern Somalia
 Badan Chandra Borphukan, Indian military leader
 Bergenia crassifolia, a plant